Bremerhaven-Wulsdorf is a railway station on the Bremen–Bremerhaven line in the  district of the city of Bremerhaven, Germany.

History
The station was opened in 1862 as part of the Bremen-Geestemünde railway line.

Operational usage

The station is only served by RegionalBahn trains. Trains operated by Bremen S-Bahn to Bremen Hbf and Twistringen call at the station. The EVB operate the single-track line to Bremervörde and Buxtehude that branches off the main line at the southern end of the station. The next stop to the south is Loxstedt (code HLOX) on the line to Twistringen, the next station to the east is Sellstedt (ASLL) on the line to Buxtehude.
Passenger access to the station is provided by a stairwell that leads to a street overpass.

References

Railway stations in Bremen (state)
Wulsdorf
Eisenbahnen und Verkehrsbetriebe Elbe-Weser
Railway stations in Germany opened in 1862